The 1965–66 Ranji Trophy was the 32nd season of the Ranji Trophy. Bombay won the title defeating Rajasthan in the final.

Highlights
R. G. Nadkarni captained Bombay to a win for the third season in a row. As of 2017, he is the only captain to win three consecutive Ranji titles.
Ravinder Pal took a hat-trick for Delhi v Southern Punjab. This match was the first first class match played at Sector 16 Stadium, Chandigarh

Group stage

West Zone

North Zone

East Zone

South Zone

Central Zone

Knockout stage

Final

 The match was played on a coir matting wicket.
 Wadekar (185) and Dilip Sardesai (99) added 212 runs in 220 minutes. Sardesai spent half an hour in the nineties, was dropped at extra cover and then stumped for 99 in 300 minutes with 9 fours. Wadekar hit 26 fours and a six off Sunderam. 
 The Ranji trophy was presented by Gayatri Devi of Jaipur

Scorecards and averages
Cricinfo
Cricketarchive

References

External links

1966 in Indian cricket
Domestic cricket competitions in 1965–66
Ranji Trophy seasons